The following is a list of bishops of the Catholic Church in the United States, including its five inhabited territories. 

The U.S. Catholic Church comprises:

 176 Latin Church dioceses led by bishops
 18 Eastern Catholic eparchies led by eparchs
 the Archdiocese for the Military Services, USA , for military personnel
 the Personal Ordinariate of the Chair of Saint Peter, a special diocese of Anglican converts to Catholicism. If the personal ordinary is not a bishop, he is the equivalent of a diocesan bishop under canon law.

Organization 
The 176 Latin Church dioceses in the United States are divided into 32 ecclesiastical provinces.  Each province has a metropolitan archdiocese led by an archbishop, and at least one suffragan diocese. In some cases, a titular archbishop is named diocesan bishop of a diocese that is not a metropolitan archdiocese, for example, Archbishop Celestine Damiano, Bishop of Camden (New Jersey).  One archbishop—that of the Archdiocese for the Military Services—is not a metropolitan.   

In most archdioceses and some large dioceses, one or more auxiliary bishops serve in association with the diocesan bishop.  Some archdioceses and dioceses have coadjutor archbishops or bishops who are normally appointed to assist an elderly or ailing archbishop or bishop. There are several dioceses in the United States' other four inhabited territories. In the Commonwealth of Puerto Rico, the bishops in the six dioceses (one metropolitan archdiocese and five suffragan dioceses) form their own episcopal conference, the Conferencia Episcopal Puertorriqueña. The bishops in U.S. insular areas in the Pacific Ocean—the Commonwealth of the Northern Mariana Islands, the territory of American Samoa, and the territory of Guam—are members of the Episcopal Conference of the Pacific. 

All active and retired bishops in the United States and the territory of the U.S. Virgin Islands—diocesan, coadjutor, and auxiliary—are members of the United States Conference of Catholic Bishops (USCCB). 

The United States contains two Eastern Catholic metropoliae, each led by a metropolitan archbishop:   

 The four Byzantine Catholic (Ruthenian) eparchies constitute one metropolia, with Pittsburgh as the metropolitan see.
 The four Ukrainian Catholic eparchies constitute the second metropolia, with Philadelphia as the metropolitan see.

Cardinals 
As of October 2022, six Latin Church metropolitan archbishops in the United States are also cardinals: 

 Boston (Seán O'Malley)
 Chicago (Blase Cupich)
 Galveston-Houston (Daniel DiNardo) 
 Newark (Joseph Tobin)
 New York (Timothy Dolan)
 Washington (Wilton Daniel Gregory) 

Four American archdioceses have retired archbishops who served as cardinal-archbishop of their archdiocese: 

 Detroit (Adam Maida)
 Los Angeles (Roger Mahony)
 Philadelphia (Justin Rigali)
 Washington (Donald Wuerl) 

One suffragan diocese is led by a cardinal:

 San Diego (Robert W. McElroy)
Three American archdioceses have former archbishops who were created cardinals after they completed their tenures as diocesan archbishops: 

 Baltimore (Edwin O'Brien)
 Denver (James Stafford)
 St. Louis (Raymond Burke)

Latin Church bishops

Bishops emeriti

Eastern Catholic eparchs

Metropolia of Philadelphia for the Ukrainians 
See: :Category:Ukrainian Catholic Metropolia of Philadelphia
The Ukrainian Catholic Metropolitan Province of Philadelphia consists of four eparchies of the Ukrainian Greek Catholic Church, and covers the entire United States.

Metropolia of Pittsburgh for the Ruthenians 
See: :Category:Byzantine Catholic Metropolia of Pittsburgh
The Byzantine Catholic Metropolitan Province of Pittsburgh is a sui iuris metropolia, traditionally linked to the Ruthenian Catholic Church. The metropolia consists of four eparchies of the Byzantine Ruthenian Catholic Church and covers the entire United States, with jurisdiction for all Ruthenian Catholics in the United States, as well as other Byzantine Rite Catholics without an established hierarchy in the country.

Eastern Catholic eparchs whose eparchies are immediately subject to the Holy See 

The other Eastern Catholic Churches with eparchies (dioceses) or exarchates established in the United States are not grouped into metropoliae. All are immediately subject to the Holy See, with limited oversight by the head of their respective sui iuris churches.

Eparchs emeriti

Personal Ordinariate of the Chair of Saint Peter

American bishops serving outside the United States

Bishops serving in Vatican City
 Raymond Leo Burke, patron of the Sovereign Military Order of Malta
 Joseph Augustine Di Noia, O.P., adjunct secretary of the Congregation for the Doctrine of the Faith
Kevin Joseph Farrell, camerlengo of the Holy Roman Church and prefect of the Dicastery for the Laity, Family and Life
 James Michael Harvey, archpriest of the Basilica of Saint Paul Outside the Walls

Bishops emeriti serving in Vatican City
 Edwin Frederick O'Brien, grand master emeritus of the Equestrian Order of the Holy Sepulchre of Jerusalem
 James Francis Stafford, major penitentiary emeritus of the Apostolic Penitentiary

Bishops serving in Vatican Diplomatic Corps
 Charles Daniel Balvo, apostolic nuncio to Australia (Archdiocese of New York)
 Michael Wallace Banach, apostolic nuncio to  Hungary (Diocese of Worcester)
 Charles John Brown, apostolic nuncio to the Philippines (Archdiocese of New York)
 Peter Brian Wells, apostolic nuncio to Thailand, Cambodia, and Laos (Diocese of Tulsa)

Bishops emeriti serving in Vatican Diplomatic Corps 
 Edward Joseph Adams, apostolic nuncio emeritus to Great Britain (Archdiocese of Philadelphia)
 Michael A. Blume, S.V.D., apostolic nuncio emeritus to Hungary (Diocese of Fort Wayne-South Bend and the Chicago Province of the Society of the Divine Word)
 James Green, apostolic nuncio emeritus to Iceland, Sweden, Denmark, Finland, and Norway (Archdiocese of Philadelphia)
 Thomas Edward Gullickson, apostolic nuncio emeritus to Switzerland and Liechtenstein (Diocese of Sioux Falls)
 Joseph Marino, president of the Pontifical Ecclesiastical Academy (Diocese of Birmingham)

Bishops serving in foreign sees
 Christopher Cardone, O.P., archbishop of Honiara (Solomon Islands)
 Arthur Colgan, C.S.C., auxiliary bishop of Chosica (Peru)
 Robert Herman Flock, bishop of San Ignacio de Velasco (Bolivia)
 Robert Francis Prevost, O.S.A., bishop of Chiclayo (Peru)

Bishops emeriti serving in foreign sees
 Gordon Bennett, S.J., bishop emeritus of Mandeville (Jamaica)
 Ernest Bertrand Boland, O.P., bishop emeritus of Multan (Pakistan)
 Luis Morgan Casey, vicar apostolic emeritus of Pando (Bolivia)

Non-American bishops serving in the United States
 Christophe Pierre, apostolic nuncio to the U.S. (Nunciature of the Holy See in Washington, D.C.)
 Gabriele Giordano Caccia, permanent observer of the Holy See to the United Nations

See also

 Appointment of Catholic bishops
 Catholic Church and politics in the United States
 Catholic Church by country
 Catholic Church in the United States
 Christianity in the United States
 Global organisation of the Catholic Church
 Hierarchy of the Catholic Church
 Historical list of the Catholic bishops of Puerto Rico
 Historical list of the Catholic bishops of the United States
 History of Roman Catholicism in the United States
 List of Catholic cathedrals in the United States
 List of Catholic dioceses in the United States
 List of heads of the diplomatic missions of the Holy See
 List of Roman Catholic apostolic administrations
 List of Roman Catholic archdioceses (by country and continent)
 List of Roman Catholic dioceses (alphabetical)
 List of Roman Catholic dioceses (structured view) (including episcopal conferences and USCCB regions)
 List of Roman Catholic military dioceses
 List of Roman Catholic titular sees

Footnotes

Resources

Bishops in the United States